Mandera is the capital and largest town of Mandera County, Kenya

Mandera may also refer to:
 Mandera County, Kenya
 Mandera (Somaliland), a town
 Mandera, Pwani, a ward in Chalinze District, Pwani Region, Tanzania